During the 1960–61 English football season, West Ham United competed in the Football League First Division.

Season summary
In the 1960–61 season, Ted Fenton left West Ham in March which was never fully explained by the club. Under strain and on sick-leave and with West Ham's league position suffering he left the club under circumstances which both he and the club decided would remain confidential. He was succeeded as manager in April 1961 by Ron Greenwood, who guided the Hammers to a 16th-place finish at the end of the campaign.

Final league table

Results
West Ham United's score comes first

Legend

Football League First Division

FA Cup

League Cup

Squad

References

West Ham United F.C. seasons
West Ham United
West Ham United
1960 sports events in London